Interstate 11 (I-11) is an Interstate Highway that currently runs for  on a  predominantly northwest–southeast alignment in the US state of Nevada, running concurrently with US Route 93 (US 93) between the Arizona state line and Henderson. The freeway is tentatively planned to run from Nogales, Arizona, to the vicinity of Reno, Nevada, generally following the current routes of I-19, I-10, US 93, and US 95. Planners anticipate upgrading two existing highway segments to carry future I-11: US 93 in Arizona from Wickenburg to the Nevada state line on the Mike O'Callaghan–Pat Tillman Memorial Bridge over the Colorado River, and US 95 in Nevada from the Las Vegas Valley to Tonopah. An exact alignment for I-11 has yet to be determined outside of these sections; however, a number of corridor alternatives have been identified for further study and refinement.

As originally proposed in the 2012 Moving Ahead for Progress in the 21st Century Act, the highway would run only from Casa Grande, Arizona, to Las Vegas. This was to provide a Las Vegas–Phoenix freeway link. However, extensions of the corridor to the north toward Reno and to the south toward Nogales have since been approved by the 2015 Fixing America's Surface Transportation Act.

The proposed numbering of this highway does not currently fit within the usual conventions of the existing Interstate Highway grid as it is east of I-15 and should therefore have a number greater than 15. However, I-17 was already built to the east of the I-11 alignment in Arizona, making it impossible to fit this freeway's Interstate number into the national grid and remain within the traditional numbering convention. The subsequent plan to extend the Interstate north of Las Vegas to Reno would, if constructed, put that portion of I-11 west of I-15 and thus in line with the national grid numbering conventions.

The 80th session of the Nevada Legislature passed a bill designating the entire route of I-11 in the state as the Purple Heart Highway, which went into effect on July 1, 2019.

Route description

Arizona
The southern terminus of the freeway would be at I-19 Business Loop in Nogales, Arizona, concurrent with that of I-19 proper, or follow State Route 189 (SR 189) from its intersection with I-19 to the Mariposa Port of Entry where it continues south as Federal Highway 15D, creating a Nogales, Arizona–Nogales, Sonora metro area bypass for high-density CANAMEX Corridor traffic. As originally envisioned, the freeway would then join I-10 in Tucson and continue to Casa Grande. However, corridor alternatives were studied, and the draft tier 1 environmental impact statement selected a recommended corridor alternative that would split from I-19 near Sahuarita and travel around the Tucson Mountains as a Tucson bypass route, then travel parallel to I-10 until Casa Grande. The two Interstates would be within miles of each other, and a short connection to I-10 is proposed in Marana.

At or near the interchange with I-8 and I-10 in Casa Grande, the freeway would split from I-10 and travel in a generally westward and then northward direction as a bypass route around the Phoenix metropolitan area. Two general corridor alternatives have been identified for this bypass section. One recommended alternative would have the highway running concurrently with I-8 west to Gila Bend, turning north to its interchange with I-10 in Buckeye or Tonopah. The second recommended alternative would have the highway run concurrently with I-8 east to an intersection with either Loop 303 or the Hassayampa Freeway, and then follow some combination of those highways, SR 30, or SR 85 to an intersection with I-10 in or near Buckeye.

North of I-10 in Buckeye or Tonopah, the study has identified a general corridor roughly parallel to the Hassayampa River with two more specific corridor alignments. The first would create a new highway running north to the US 60/SR 74 intersection in Morristown before turning northwest to run concurrently with US 60 to its intersection with US 93 in Wickenburg, thereafter, running concurrently with US 93 to the northwest. The second alignment would follow the alignment of the Hassayampa Freeway as proposed by the Maricopa Association of Governments to an intersection with US 93 northwest of Wickenburg in Yavapai County.

The highway would then run concurrently with US 93 through northern Arizona, including a concurrency with I-40 in and near Kingman. After leaving Kingman, the highway would continue north, crossing the Mike O'Callaghan–Pat Tillman Memorial Bridge into Nevada.

Nevada
In Nevada, the highway currently begins at the Arizona state line on the Hoover Dam Bypass, then runs along the  Boulder City Bypass around Boulder City, which opened on August 9, 2018. It is signed concurrently with US 93 throughout. At mile 14, I-11 intersects and joins with US 95 heading north. Continuing northwest, the highway runs along a former  section of I-515 around Henderson before currently ending at the Henderson Spaghetti Bowl interchange with I-215 and SR 564.

I-11 will be extended through the Las Vegas Valley along the existing alignments of I-515/US 93/US 95 to downtown Las Vegas, then running concurrently with US 95 northwest to SR 157.

History
As recently as 1997, US 93 was mostly a two-lane road between Wickenburg and Hoover Dam, and was known for its dangerous curves and hills in the stretch between Wickenburg and I-40. In the late 1990s, ADOT began widening US 93 to four lanes, and in some areas building a completely new roadway. In other places along the route, ADOT simply repaved the old highway and built two new lanes parallel to it. ADOT also began studying the possibility of adding grade separations to US 93 near the Santa Maria River to make the road a full freeway.

At the same time Nevada and Arizona began looking at US 93's crossing of Hoover Dam, a major bottleneck for regional commerce, with hairpin turns, multiple crosswalks for pedestrians, and steep grades. Plans for a bridge to bypass the dam became even more urgent when the road was closed to trucks after 9/11 in 2001, forcing commercial traffic to detour through Bullhead City, Arizona, and Laughlin, Nevada, causing major transport delays as a result.

With the completion of the Mike O'Callaghan–Pat Tillman Memorial Bridge on October 14, 2010, the vast majority of the roadway is now a four-lane divided highway. Still, with Phoenix and Las Vegas as the two largest neighboring cities in the United States not connected by Interstate Highway, leaders in both cities lobbied to include I-11 in the next Transportation Equity Act reauthorization. With the rise of the concept of "megapolitan" urban regions, I-11 is considered a key connector to unify the triangle formed by Las Vegas, Phoenix, and the Los Angeles area (the triangle consisting of I-15 to the north/west, I-10 to the south and I-11 on the east). The Federal Highway Administration (FHWA) approved NDOT's environmental review of a bypass around Boulder City, which would connect the end of the recently constructed Hoover Dam Bypass bridge east of Boulder City to I-515 west of the town.

In December 2013, University of Nevada, Las Vegas (UNLV), researchers discovered naturally occurring asbestos in the route of the Boulder City bypass. Containing the asbestos and monitoring the surrounding air to keep workers safe was estimated to cost at least an additional $12 million. Work was completed without any OSHA incidents, with 14,000 air samples taken during the construction.

On March 21, 2014, signs for I-11 were installed along the US 93 corridor. On May 21, 2014, NDOT submitted an application to the American Association of State Highway and Transportation Officials (AASHTO) to request the creation of the I-11 designation between the Arizona state line and the I-215/I-515 Interchange in Henderson. AASHTO approved this request at their Spring 2014 Special Committee on US Route Numbering meeting, contingent on FHWA approval. On August 16, 2017, the first southbound segment was opened to traffic, with its accompanying northbound segment opening on January 27, 2018. On February 20, 2018, NDOT opened additional ramps connecting the new Railroad Pass Casino Road to both the Boulder City Parkway (current US 93 and US 95) and to I-11 (southbound exit and northbound entrance). The final portion of Phase 1, between the new casino access road and US 95, opened on May 23, 2018. On August 9, 2018, Phase 2 was opened to traffic, officially completing the Boulder City Bypass.

Phase 2, which began construction on April 6, 2015, was expected to open by October 2018; however, in May 2018, the RTC announced that the section would be open by June 2018, three months ahead of schedule. That opening date was subsequently pushed back to August 9, 2018, as it was still in the post-construction stage. In March 2019, NDOT replaced I-515 signs along its southernmost  stretch with I-11 signs.

In July 2022, NDOT decided to route I-11 along the existing alignments of I-515/US 93/US 95 to downtown Las Vegas, then running concurrently with US 95 northwest to SR 157 rather than use I-215 or construct a new corridor as had been proposed.

Current status
, the only completed sections of I-11 are the Hoover Dam Bypass, the Boulder City Bypass, and a former  section of I-515. The Nevada portion of the original I-11 corridor is a full freeway that meets current Interstate Highway standards from the Mike O'Callaghan–Pat Tillman Memorial Bridge on US 93 to the northwest of Las Vegas on US 95. While the bulk of US 93 through Arizona has been upgraded to four lanes, some portions of the corridor are not built to Interstate Highway standards, as there are scattered at-grade intersections, substandard roadway and shoulder widths, median crossovers, and other deficiencies. Part of these dual roadways are repaved, re-striped sections of very old parts of US 93. Farther south, a direct system interchange with US 93 and I-40 is planned to eliminate the bottleneck at Beale Street in western Kingman. The first phase of construction, planned to begin in 2024 and finish in 2026, will construct direct connectors from westbound I-40 to northbound US 93 and from southbound US 93 to eastbound I-40. The remaining movements between US 93 and I-40 will continue to use the existing Beale Street interchange until traffic demands warrant and the second phase can be funded.

, Phase 4 of the project is under construction. The US 93 Corridor Improvement Project will finish what was started in 1998 and connect the four sections of the divided highway to Wickenburg, allowing more traffic on these congested roads. Up north, a direct interchange with I-40 and US 93 is planned. This will eliminate the existing Cedar Hills interchange to allow a better flow of traffic directly onto US 93 from I-40. US 93 will be cosigned as I-11 once it is built to Interstate standards.

Funding
The funding bill for the United States Department of Transportation, which replaced stopgaps that expired on June 30, 2012, officially designated I-11. This bill sped up funding for studying, engineering, and possibly building the highway. The Arizona legislature passed a law in 2009 that allowed private investors to team up with ADOT. In July 2012, Nevada's Transportation Board awarded $2.5 million in contracts to a team of consultants to study I-11's feasibility and its environmental and economic consequences.

Tucson extension plans
Officials in Pima County, Arizona, supported an extension of the planned I-11 from Casa Grande, which would wrap southwest of the Tucson Mountains before meeting with I-19 in Sahuarita, south of Tucson, and continuing east to I-10. Over 800 residents signed a petition opposing that west-side bypass because it would impact the Arizona-Sonora Desert Museum, Saguaro National Park, and Ironwood Forest National Monument. They recommended that  I-11 be built on top of the existing I-10 route through Tucson. The additional segment would create the Tucson bypass route identified as a critical need by ADOT based upon I-10 traffic projections. In 2019, the draft tier 1 environmental impact statement selected the Tucson bypass route as the recommended corridor alternative, with the corridor parallel to I-10 until Casa Grande and a connection to I-10 in Marana.

Northern Nevada extension plans
The proposal to extend I-11 to the Reno area was supported by both of Nevada's US Senators, Harry Reid and Dean Heller, as well as the rest of Nevada's delegation to the US Congress. Heller stated that connecting the Phoenix area with Las Vegas and Northern Nevada would "spur long-term economic development, create jobs and bolster international trade". The 2015 FAST Act gave Congressional approval to the proposed extensions in Nevada and Arizona, but not to extensions north of I-80.

The Reno City Council was informed of potential I-11 corridor plans in March 2018. These include a route through Yerington that roughly parallels SR 208 until just before the Topaz Lake area, then takes a new route into Gardnerville and Minden before meeting up with current I-580 in Carson City, which it follows to its terminus of I-80 in Reno. The other potential corridors stick closer to US 95, with one following US 95 Alt. through Silver Springs to meet I-80 in Fernley, while another would take a new route east of Silver Springs to Fernley, meeting current US 50 Alt. west of Fallon, which would then go to I-80 in Fernley. Another proposed route would go east of Mina and Luning and go north through Salt Wells before meeting US 95 north of Fallon, which then meets I-80 farther north. Other minor alterations to these routes were also shown.

Long-term corridor plans
I-11 was previously projected to serve as an Intermountain West part of the US's long-term CANAMEX Corridor transportation plans, with potential extensions south from Casa Grande to the Sonoran border, and north from Las Vegas through northern Nevada (potentially passing through Reno or Elko) and onward through either eastern Oregon–Washington or western Idaho before terminating at the Canadian border. , I-11 is projected to become the Intermountain West Corridor, extending from Phoenix and Las Vegas through Reno to the Pacific Northwest via central or eastern Oregon and central Washington to the Canadian Border. Feasibility studies for these corridor extensions began in July 2013 and were published in November 2014.

Exit list
Old exits on I-11 were formerly exits on I-515 numbered according to US 95 mileposts.

See also

References

External links

 I-11 and Intermountain West Corridor Study
 I-11 within the Las Vegas Valley
 I-11 from the Las Vegas Valley to I-80
 Tucson Bypass, Pima County government study
 Route map from the Phoenix Business Journal
 Sonoran Institute's Proposed Interstate 11 Analysis: Casa Grande to the Mike O’Callaghan-Pat Tillman Memorial Bridge, 2014

11
11
Transportation in Clark County, Nevada
Lake Mead National Recreation Area
Boulder City, Nevada
Transportation in Henderson, Nevada